The Joint Cyberspace Command (MCCE), known until 2020 as Joint Cyber-Defence Command (MCCD), is a Spanish cyberspace service of the Defence Staff responsible for planning and carrying out he actions related to cyber defence in networks and information and telecommunications systems of the Ministry of Defense or others that might be entrusted, as well as contributing to the adequate response in cyberspace to threats or aggressions that may affect to the National Defense.

In this sense, the MCCD directs and coordinates, in the matter of cyber defense, the activity of the centers of response to incidents of security of the information of the different branches Armed Forces; it exercises the timely, legitimate and proportionate response in cyberspace to threats or aggressions that may affect the National Defense and defines, directs and coordinates awareness, training and specialized training in this area. In addition, he is responsible for the development and detail of the Information Security policies in the Information and Telecommunications Systems (SEGINFOSIT) and the direction of execution and control of compliance with these policies, within the scope of the Ministry of Defense.

The MCCD was created on February 19, 2013 by a Defence Ministry Order 10/2013, by which the Joint Cyber-Defence Command is created. In 2020, it was renamed as Joint Cyberspace Command. The current Chief Commander of the MCCD is divisional general Rafael García Hernández.

Functions
The functions of the Joint Cyberspace Command are:
 Ensure free access to cyberspace, in order to fulfill the missions and tasks assigned to the Armed Forces, through the development and use of the necessary resources and procedures.
 Guarantee the availability, integrity and confidentiality of the information, as well as the integrity and availability of the networks and systems that manage and have it commissioned.
 Guarantee the operation of the critical services of the Armed Forces's information and telecommunications systems in a degraded environment due to incidents, accidents or attacks.
 Obtain, analyze and exploit information on cyber attacks and incidents in networks and systems of their responsibility.
 Exercise the timely, legitimate and proportionate response in cyberspace to threats or aggressions that may affect the Defence of Spain.
 To direct and coordinate, in the matter of Cyberdefence, the activity of the centers of response to incidents of security of the information of the Armed Force and the one of operations of security of the information of the Ministry of Defence.
 To exercise the representation of the Ministry of Defence in the matter of military cyber defence in the national and international sphere.
 Cooperate, in the area of cyber-defence, with the national centers for response to information security incidents, in accordance with the Spanish cybersecurity strategies and policies in force, as well as with other military centers to respond to security information incidents in the international sphere.
 Define, direct and coordinate awareness, training and specialized training in cyber defence.

Organization chart 
The Joint Cyberspace Command is composed by the following bodies:

 The MCCE Command.
 The Secretariat.
 The Joint Cyberspace Command Staff (EMMCCD).
 The assistance body to the Chief Commander of the MCCE led by the Chief of Staff of the Joint Cyber-Defense Command.
 It's divided in six sections: the Coordination Section (C-0), the Cyberintelligence and Security Section (C-2), the Operations Section (C-3), the Plans Section (C-5), the Preparation Section (C-7) and the Cooperation and Representation Section (C-9).
 The Operations Command (JOPS).
 It's the Joint Command department responsible for the execution of cyber defense operations
 The Administration and Services Command (JAS).
 It's the administrative and technical department of the Joint Command.

Commanders

See also
 List of cyber warfare forces
 United States Cyber Command
 Cyber force
 People's Liberation Army Strategic Support Force
 Norwegian Cyber Defence Force

References

Computer security organizations
Cyberinfrastructure
Military units and formations established in 2013
Spanish intelligence agencies
Military of Spain